Lewis Mbah Enoh (born 23 October 1992) is a Cameroonian professional footballer who plays as a forward for Cypriot club Olympiakos Nicosia.

Club career
Enoh started his career with Portuguese Second Division club GD Sourense. He scored 10 goals in 14 matches.

Sporting
In December 2013, he signed a pre-season contract with Liga de Honra club Sporting B. He signed for a 5-year contract keeping him with the club till 2019 and a buyout clause of £60 million.  He made his debut for the club against Trofense in which he received a yellow card.

Leixões (loan)
On 29 January 2015, he would be loaned to Segunda Liga side Leixões until June. Enoh scored his first goal for Leixões in a 2–3 away defeat to Desportivo das Aves in the Segunda Liga on 22 February.

Lokeren
In June 2015, Enoh signed with Lokeren, for a transfer fee of €350 thousand.

References

External links

1992 births
People from Bamenda
Living people
Cameroonian footballers
Association football forwards
G.D. Sourense players
Sporting CP B players
Leixões S.C. players
K.S.C. Lokeren Oost-Vlaanderen players
FC Politehnica Iași (2010) players
Casa Pia A.C. players
S.C. Covilhã players
PAEEK players
Olympiakos Nicosia players
Campeonato de Portugal (league) players
Liga Portugal 2 players
Belgian Pro League players
Liga I players
Cypriot First Division players
Cameroonian expatriate footballers
Expatriate footballers in Portugal
Expatriate footballers in Belgium
Expatriate footballers in Romania
Expatriate footballers in Cyprus
Cameroonian expatriate sportspeople in Portugal
Cameroonian expatriate sportspeople in Belgium
Cameroonian expatriate sportspeople in Romania
Cameroonian expatriate sportspeople in Cyprus